Kenichi Suzuki may refer to:

Name spelled 鈴木憲一 
 , member of the Japanese House of Councillors for the Chiba at-large district from 1947 to 1950

Name spelled 鈴木 賢一 
, Japanese long-distance runner
, Japanese sport wrestler

Name spelling unknown 
 Kenichi Suzuki (cyclist) (born 1981), Japanese cyclist in 2011 Jelajah Malaysia etc.
 Kenichi Suzuki (table tennis), Japanese table tennis player, played Table tennis at the 1992 Summer Paralympics
 Kenichi Suzuki  (musician), Bassist and vocalist for Japanese metal band Ningen Isu